Kathrin Wörle-Scheller (née Wörle, born 18 February 1984) is a former German tennis player.

Wörle-Scheller won three singles titles and seven doubles titles on the ITF Circuit. On 22 February 2010, she reached her best singles ranking of world No. 119. On 16 May 2011, she peaked at No. 99 in the WTA doubles rankings.

She played her last match on the ITF Circuit in August 2015.

Playing for the Germany Fed Cup team, Wörle-Scheller has a win–loss record of 0–2 in Fed Cup competitions.

In September 2012, she married. In April 2013, she changed her surname to Wörle-Scheller.

WTA career finals

Doubles: 1 (1 runner-up)

ITF finals

Singles: 8 (3–5)

Doubles: 17 (7–10)

References

External links
 
 
 

1984 births
Living people
People from Lindau
Sportspeople from Swabia (Bavaria)
German female tennis players
Tennis people from Bavaria